Tomáš Rubeš (born September 25, 1992) is a Czech professional ice hockey player. He is currently playing for Blue Devils Weiden of the Oberliga. He previously played with HC Sparta Praha in the Czech Extraliga.

References

External links

1992 births
Living people
Anglet Hormadi Élite players
HC Berounští Medvědi players
Boxers de Bordeaux players
Czech ice hockey centres
Scorpions de Mulhouse players
HC Sparta Praha players
Ice hockey people from Prague
HC Stadion Litoměřice players
1. EV Weiden players
20th-century Czech people
21st-century Czech people
Competitors at the 2017 World Games
Competitors at the 2022 World Games
World Games gold medalists
World Games silver medalists
Czech expatriate ice hockey players in Sweden
Czech expatriate ice hockey players in Germany
Czech expatriate sportspeople in France
Expatriate ice hockey players in France